Sewer Trout was an American punk rock band, formed in Sacramento, California in 1985. The group's uptempo bass lines and fast-paced songs would serve as a basis and influence for many of the later California pop punk bands of the 1990s. The band consisted of Jim MacLean (lead vocals/bass), his brother Hal MacLean (drums), and Keith Lehtinen (guitar/backing vocals), with Erik Benson joining as a second guitarist after meeting Hal at Sacramento State. Although Benson's progressive rock influences eventually led to the band's break-up and re-joining as the Well Hung Monks.

History
Formed in Concord in 1985, Sewer Trout moved to Sacramento with the MacLean brothers and Keith Lehtinen. The group was a fixture of the early 924 Gilman Street scene and its first release was on the Maximumrocknroll compilation album Turn It Around! in October 1987. The same year saw the group's first record released through Lookout! Records. A few more records followed on Lookout!, Very Small Records, and their own label, One Shot Flop. All of Sewer Trout's material was later released as the compilation album From the Forgotten Memories of Punks Failed Hopes and Dreams Loom in 1997.

Sewer Trout were friends with David Hayes, the co-founder of Lookout! Records and the owner of Very Small Records. Through his labels, Hayes was able to focus a lot of attention on the Sacramento punk scene, often filling his compilations with up to ten Sacramento bands.

On December 1, 2005, a message was posted on Sewer Trout's Myspace announcing that Jim MacLean had committed suicide. The message stated "MacLean took his own life Monday or Tuesday after the Thanksgiving weekend. Jim may be gone, but his music will live forever."

Band members
 Jim MacLean - lead vocals, bass (1985-1990) (deceased)
 Keith Lehtinen - guitar, backing vocals (1985-1990)
 Hal MacLean - drums (1985-1990)
 Erik Benson - guitar (1988-1990)

Discography

Releases
 From the Bowels of Suburbia Emerge... (demo) (1985)
 Songs About Drinking (EP) - Lookout! Records (1987)
 Sewer Trout for President (EP) - One Shot Flop (1988)
 Flawless (10-inch EP) - Very Small Records (1989)
 From the Forgotten Memories of Punks Failed Hopes and Dreams Loom - Spa Records (1997)

Compilation appearances
 "Sewer Trout for President" on Lethal Noise, Vol. 2 - David Hayes self-released cassette (1987)
 "Wally and the Beaver Go to Nicaragua" on Turn It Around! - Maximumrocknroll (1987)
 "Sex Trout" on We've Got Your Shorts (EP) - Fascist Food Records (1988)
 "Vagina Envy" on The Thing That Ate Floyd - Lookout! Records (1988)
 "Bang 'Ol Lulu" and "Holiday in Romania" on Alone in This World - Bat Guano Records (1989)
 "Holiday in Romania" on Four Two Pudding - Very Small Records (1993)

External links
Sewer Trout Myspace page
Sewer Trout at Nokilli.com

Punk rock groups from California
Musical groups established in 1985
Musical groups disestablished in 1990
American musical trios
Musical quartets
Musical groups from Sacramento, California
1985 establishments in California